The best 33 football players of Ukraine (33 найкращі футболісти України) is an annual list of the three best football players in each position for the past calendar year composed by the Ukrainian newspaper Komanda.

Overview
It is an unofficial rating and is being conducted through the adaptation of a previous official annual Soviet award endorsed by the Football Federation of Soviet Union that was discontinued after the fall of the Soviet Union. The newspaper conducts the rating since 1998 for the Ukrainian national players participating in the Ukrainian Premier League. 

A similar award recently was adopted by one of the leading Ukrainian football news websites "UA-Football" in 2006. In its section "the best out of the best" the website conducts various polls of its readers concerning the Ukrainian football for the past calendar year and usually publishing their results in its January editions. Among its well established ratings are the combined symbolic team, the best coach, the best legionnaire (foreign player), and many others.

33 best winners
2007 by Komanda

References

External links
 @ UA-futbol
 Official web-site of the newspaper
UA-Football website

Ukrainian football trophies and awards